Nol de Ruiter (born 6 April 1940) is a Dutch football coach and former player.

Playing career
Born in Utrecht, De Ruiter played football for local sides DOS, Velox and USV Elinkwijk. The three clubs merged in 1970 to form the professional FC Utrecht. He played as a defender.

Coaching career
After retiring as a player, De Ruiter began his coaching career. He has managed a number of Dutch club sides – FC Den Bosch, SC Cambuur, FC Wageningen, BV Veendam, FC Utrecht and ADO Den Haag. As manager he led Utrecht to victory in the 1984–85 KNVB Cup. De Ruiter has also managed the national sides of the Netherlands and Egypt.

References

External links
Profile at Voetbal International 

Living people
1940 births
Dutch footballers
Footballers from Utrecht (city)
Association football defenders
Velox SC players
VV DOS players
USV Elinkwijk players
Dutch football managers
Egypt national football team managers
FC Den Bosch managers
SC Cambuur managers
FC Wageningen managers
SC Veendam managers
FC Utrecht managers
ADO Den Haag managers
Netherlands national football team managers
SV SVV managers
Dutch expatriate football managers
Dutch expatriate sportspeople in Egypt
Expatriate football managers in Egypt